Rabun Gap is an unincorporated community in Rabun County, Georgia, United States. The community is located along U.S. Route 23/441 south of Dillard. Rabun Gap has a post office with ZIP code 30568.

The community takes its name from the mountain pass in which it is situated.

References

Unincorporated communities in Rabun County, Georgia
Unincorporated communities in Georgia (U.S. state)